Meinhard II, nicknamed the Elder ( – 1231), a member of the House of Gorizia (Meinhardiner), was ruling Count of Gorizia from 1220 until his death. He also held the title of Vogt (Reeve) of the Patriarchate of Aquileia.

Life
He was the younger son of Count Engelbert II of Gorizia (d. 1191) and his wife Adelaide, a daughter of the Bavarian count Otto I of Scheyern-Dachau-Valley, a progenitor of the ducal House of Wittelsbach.

Meinhard is known to have taken part in the German Crusade of 1197 launched by the Hohenstaufen emperor Henry VI. He laid witness to the death of his friend, the Babenberg duke Frederick I of Austria with Bishop Wolfger of Passau, Count Eberhard of Dörnberg, Count Ulrich III of Eppan and Frederick's closest attendant on 16 April 1198 at Acre.

In 1220, Meinhard II succeeded his elder brother Engelbert III as Count of Gorizia. He died in 1231 and was succeeded by his nephew Meinhard III, who in 1253 also inherited the County of Tyrol.

Marriage and issue
Count Meinhard II married three times:
 Kunigunde, a daughter of Count Conrad I of Peilstein, a member of the Siegharding dynasty, from whom the Meinhardiner claimed to descend, in 1183
 Adelaide, about whom little is known
 a daughter of Count Henry I of Tyrol.
From these marriages he had several children, but none of them survived childhood.

References

External links 
 Entry at GenMa

Bibliography 
 
 
 

Counts of Gorizia
1160s births
Year of birth unknown
1231 deaths
Christians of the Crusade of 1197